Below is a list of radio stations in Metro Manila, whose coverage is in part or whole Mega Manila area.

AM Stations

FM Stations

References

Metro Manila
 
Radio stations